State Highway 46 (abbreviated SH-46) is a state highway in northwest Oklahoma.

Route description
SH-46 begins at US-60/US-283/SH-51 on the west side of Arnett. The road runs north  to the junction of SH-15 at Gage, then continues another  to May, where it crosses US-270/US-412/SH-3.

Three miles north of May, SH-46 crosses the North Canadian River, and  after that, SH-149 branches off to the west, connecting to the town of Laverne.

Junction list

References

External links
 SH-46 at OKHighways

046
Transportation in Ellis County, Oklahoma
Transportation in Harper County, Oklahoma